Skeerpoort is a village 24 km south of Brits and 32 km northeast of Hekpoort, about 7 km southwest of the Hartebeespoort Dam, in eastern North West province, South Africa. The small and discontinuous village is set among orchards and agricultural lands.

Afrikaans for 'shaving defile', the mountain pass from which it takes its name may have been so called by the commando under Hendrik Potgieter because they stopped there on a Sunday to spruce up. Another explanation is that a commando under Casper Kruger purchased soap and shaving equipment from a trader to spruce up before entering Pretoria.

References

Populated places in the Madibeng Local Municipality